South Carolina Highway 98 may refer to:

South Carolina Highway 98 (1928–1938), a former state highway northeast of Cheraw
South Carolina Highway 98 (1940–1956), a former state highway from Robat to near Pacolet

098